The 1975 Asian Basketball Confederation Championship for Men were held in Bangkok, Thailand. This was the first time that the Chinese national team participated in the tournament, as Taiwan previously competed instead of the Chinese mainland. However, China dominated the competition with a perfect record, with no team even coming close to beating them.

Preliminary round

Group A

Group B

Final round
 The results and the points of the matches between the same teams that were already played during the preliminary round shall be taken into account for the final round.

Classification 7th–13th

Championship

Final standing

Awards

References
 Results
 archive.fiba.com

Asia Championship, 1975
1975
B
B
November 1975 sports events in Thailand